Phil Tollestrup (born October 21, 1949) is a former Olympic basketball player as a member of the Canadian national men's basketball team during the 1970s.

Six feet, six inches tall forward, Tollestrup attributes the development of his basketball ability to his being able to practice on a daily basis both at his school gym, where his father was janitor, and at the local cultural centre, which has an open gym.  The native of Raymond, Alberta was later a member of his local basketball team which won the provincial youth basketball championship in 1967 and '68.  He played college basketball at Brigham Young University, and was a teammate of Cougar and Yugoslav legend Kresimir Cosić.  He then played an additional year of college ball with the University of Lethbridge Pronghorns where for 1972-3 he was named Male Pronghorn Athlete of the Year and a CIAU All-Canadian.  After college, he was drafted by the Buffalo Braves with their last pick in the 1973 draft (19th round, 211th overall), but never played in the NBA. Instead, he played professionally with a club in the Spanish first division for the 1973-4 season, Saski Baskonia - TAU Cerámica.

Tollestrup participated in the 1971, '75, and '79 Pan Am Games, 1973 World Student Games, the 1974 FIBA World Championship, and the 1976 Summer Olympics.  He finished the Olympics as the tournament's 3rd leading scorer as the Canadians finished just out of the medals in fourth place.

Tollestrup coached McMaster University from 1978 to 1980.  He then turned to teaching school and coaching youth basketball in the Southern Alberta communities of Milk River, Stirling, and most recently Magrath where he is the Magrath High School head coach.  He has been inducted into the Alberta Sports Hall of Fame, Canadian Basketball Hall of Fame, Raymond Sports Hall of Fame, and Pronghorns Hall of Fame

References

External links

Sources
horns.uleth.ca
mccue.cc Phil Tollestrup interviewed
http://www.insidehoops.com/nba-draft/1973.shtml

1949 births
Living people
Basketball people from Alberta
Basketball players at the 1971 Pan American Games
Basketball players at the 1975 Pan American Games
Basketball players at the 1976 Summer Olympics
Basketball players at the 1979 Pan American Games
Buffalo Braves draft picks
BYU Cougars men's basketball players
Canadian expatriate basketball people in the United States
Canadian expatriate basketball people in Spain
Canadian Latter Day Saints
Canadian men's basketball players
1974 FIBA World Championship players
Canadian people of Danish descent
Lethbridge Pronghorns basketball players
Olympic basketball players of Canada
Pan American Games competitors for Canada
People from Magrath
People from Raymond, Alberta
Saski Baskonia players
Forwards (basketball)
Alberta Sports Hall of Fame inductees